János Négyesy (or Négyesy János, as should be written in Hungarian) was a Hungarian violinist with a particular interest in contemporary music. He performed world premieres of numerous works, the first two books of the Freeman Etudes (etudes I–XVI and XVII–XXXII) by American composer John Cage among others. He was also the first European violinist who recorded the complete Violin and Piano Sonatas of Charles Ives (with pianist Cornelius Cardew). He is the author of a teaching and reference book on violin techniques, which was commissioned after he met Pierre Boulez at IRCAM in 1976. In 1979, he joined the faculty of the University of California at San Diego.

He is also known for his computer paintings. He began doing these artworks after moving to San Diego, California.

Biography

János Négyesy was born in Budapest, Hungary on September 13, 1938 and died on December 20, 2013. His father was taken by the Nazis to a concentration camp, from where he never returned. He got his first violin at the age of four, and only six months later he gave his first public concert at his school. According to him, this was the moment when he decided to become a violinist. He later became a student of Ferenc Gábriel at the Liszt Ferenc Academy of Music of Budapest, who introduced him to Tibor Varga, a former student of Gábriel before World War II. After receiving an invitation in 1965, Négyesy moved to Detmold and continued his studies with Varga. From 1970 to 1974 he served as concertmaster of the Radio Berlin Orchestra, which was led by Lorin Maazel at the time. In 1976 he was invited by French composer Pierre Boulez to IRCAM for a week of performances. This invitation resulted in a commission for Négyesy to write a book on violin techniques.

In 1979, while staying in Lisboa he received a phone call at 3 a.m. asking him if he would join the Music Department at UCSD. Later it turned out that this call changed his life: as of 2012, he is an active teacher at UCSD. It was there in San Diego where he met Finnish violinist Päivikki Nykter, a former student of his, who became his wife in 1992. During the past decades they made several recordings together, the complete violin duos of Béla Bartók and compositions dedicated to them, among others.

There are several composers who dedicated pieces to Négyesy (probably the most notable is One6 by John Cage) including Attila Bozay, Carlos Fariñas, Vinko Globokar, Georg Hajdu, Roger Reynolds, Robert Wittinger and Isang Yun. He also has notable recordings of pieces of composers like John Cage, Morton Feldman or Kaija Saariaho. Recently he also became regarded as a master of Max Mathews' electronic violin.
János Negesy died on Friday, December 20, 2013.

Discography
 Dedications – Works for Two Violins  – Seven works for violin duo written expressly for János Négyesy and Päivikki Nykter. Aucourant Records, 2000.
 Solo Violin Recital – Works by five contemporary women composers. Aucourant Records, 2006.

See also
 List of Hungarians

References

External links
 An interview with János Négyesy.
 János Négyesy in DRAM.
 The unofficial website of János Négyesy.
 Computer Paintings by János Négyesy.
 Biography web page at UCSD

1938 births
2013 deaths
Hungarian classical violinists
Male classical violinists
Hungarian music educators
Digital artists
20th-century classical violinists
Concertmasters
20th-century Hungarian male musicians